Philip Billard Intercontinental Airport  is a public airport  northeast of downtown Topeka, the capital city of Kansas and the county seat of Shawnee County. It is owned by the Metropolitan Topeka Airport Authority.

Commercial airline service for Topeka used this airport until 1976. Beginning in the early 1940s TWA, Continental, and Braniff Airways stopped here, and Ozark appeared for a couple years starting around 1951. Braniff left in 1954 and Continental in 1961; Central replaced TWA in 1958 and merged into the original Frontier Airlines in 1967. Frontier continued serving the airport until the move to Forbes Field, now the Topeka Regional Airport, in 1976.

Facilities and aircraft

 13/31:  asphalt
 18/36:  asphalt

In 2004 the airport had 65,800 aircraft operations, average 180 per day: 96% general aviation, 3% military and 2% air taxi. 88 aircraft are based at this airport: 78% single engine, 11% multi-engine (10), 6% helicopters, 3% ultralights and 1% jet aircraft.

References

External links
Metropolitan Topeka Airport Authority

Airports in Kansas
Buildings and structures in Topeka, Kansas